Diédougou is a rural commune in the Cercle of Dioïla in the Koulikoro Region of south-western Mali. The commune contains 34 villages. The administrative center (chef-lieu) is at the village of Béléko Soba which lies 205 km east of Bamako. In the 2009 census the commune had a population of 39,021.

References

Communes of Koulikoro Region